The Little Turcotte River is a tributary of the Turcotte River, flowing in the Cochrane District, in Northeastern Ontario, in Canada.

Forestry is the main economic activity of the sector; recreational tourism activities, second.

The surface of the river is usually frozen from early November to mid-May, but safe circulation on the ice generally occurs from mid-November to the end of April.

Geography 
The main slopes waters of the "Little Turcotte River" are:
North side: Detour River;
East side: Turgeon River, Garneau River;
South side: Turcotte River, Burntbush River, Kabika River, Chabbie River;
West side: Turcotte River, Chabbie River, Burntbush River.

The "Little Turcotte River" originates at the mouth of a small unidentified lake
in the eastern part of the Cochrane District, in Ontario.

The mouth of the small head lake is located at:
 west of the boundary between Ontario and Quebec;
 northwest of the mouth of the "Petite Rivière Turcotte" (confluence with the Turcotte River);
 northwest of the mouth of the Turcotte River (confluence with the Turgeon River, in Quebec);
 southwest of the mouth of the Turgeon River (in Quebec);
 southeast of a southern bay of Kesagami Lake in Ontario.

From the mouth of the small head lake, the "Little Turcotte River" flows on  according to the following segments:
 to the south, curving eastward to the mouth of the Little Turcotte Lake, which the current passes through on {convert|0.8|km};
 to South-East by crossing a marsh zone at the beginning of this section.

The "Little Turcotte River" flows into a river bend on the northern shore of the Turcotte River. This confluence is located at:
 east of the boundary between Quebec and Ontario;
 southwest of the mouth of the Turcotte River (confluence with the Turgeon River);
 southwest of the mouth of the Turgeon River (confluence with the Harricana River);
 southeast of a southern bay of Kesagami Lake in Ontario.

Toponymy 
The term "Turcotte" is a surname of family of French origin.

See also 
List of rivers of Ontario

References 

Rivers of Cochrane District